Polk Township is an inactive township in Madison County, in the U.S. state of Missouri.

Polk Township was established in 1857, and named after Charles K. Polk, a pioneer settler.

References

Townships in Missouri
Townships in Madison County, Missouri
1857 establishments in Missouri